Flavius Monaxius (floruit 408–420) was a politician of the Eastern Roman Empire, praefectus urbi of Constantinople, Consul and twice praetorian prefect of the East.

Biography 
From 17 January 408 to 26 April 409 he was praefectus urbi of Constantinople. Towards the end of his term, there was a shortage of food in the city, caused by delay in the shipment of grain from Alexandria to the capital, and the population revolted. The rebels burned the praetorium and dragged Monaxius' carriage around the streets. Grain supplies directed to other cities were sent to Constantinople, and the overall grain supply for the capital was re-organised. Monaxius also created an emergency fund, partially formed by senatorial contribution, to buy grain in case of shortage.

He was praetorian prefect of the East between 10 May and 30 November 414 and then a second time between 26 August 416 and 27 May 420; during his second tenure, he dedicated a church in Perinthus. Also, on October 5, 416, he issued an edict that removed the authority of Cyril of Alexandria over the parabolani. In 419 he held the consulship; after this year, four of his servants became monks at the monastery of Saint Hypatius against his will.

Notes

Sources 
 
 Jones, Arnold Hugh Martin, John Robert Martindale, John Morris, The Prosopography of the Later Roman Empire, "Fl. Monaxius", Volume 2, Cambridge University Press, 1992, pp. 764–765.

5th-century Byzantine people
5th-century Roman consuls
Imperial Roman consuls
Praetorian prefects of the East
Urban prefects of Constantinople